Alipur is a union parishad under Satkhira Sadar Upazila of Satkhira District in the division of Khulna, Bangladesh.

Area and land use 
Alipore Union has an area of 5930.529 acres. Amount of single crop land: 125 hectares, amount of double crop land: 3,975 hectares, amount of three crop land: 1,529 hectares.

Population 
As of 2013, Alipore Union had a population of 31,120. Of these, 16,285 are males and 15,835 are females.

Administrative structure 
Union Parishad No. 7 under Alipur Union Satkhira Sadar Upazila. There are four hat-bazaars in the union.

Education system 
Alipore Union has an average literacy rate of 71%. The union has 2 colleges, 2 secondary schools, 1 lower secondary school, 3 madrasas (2 orphanages) and 11 primary schools. [1]

Religious infrastructure 
Alipore Union has 45 mosques and 2 temples.

References

Unions of Satkhira Sadar Upazila
Unions of Satkhira District